South Yorkshire Railway may refer to:

South Yorkshire Railway, also known as the South Yorkshire Coal Railway, South Yorkshire Doncaster and Goole Railway Company, or South Yorkshire and River Dun
The railway preservation society incorporated as the South Yorkshire Railway Co. Ltd., see Heritage Shunters Trust
South Yorkshire Joint Railway
South Yorkshire Junction Railway